Ulva compressa is a species of seaweed in Ulvaceae family that can be found in North America, Mediterranean Sea, and throughout Africa and Australia.

Description
The species is green coloured and is measured  in length.

Distribution 
This species is widespread worldwide including in the North and South Atlantic and in the Pacific Ocean.

Habitat
The species can be found  in the intertidal zone in sheltered to open coastal sites, in shallow water, tide pools, and also on rock pools and sand.

Consumption and production
The plant is widely produced in China, Japan, and Korea. The species is edible by both animals and humans alike, due to its high levels of nutrients and good taste. It is also used in  various cosmetics to prevent skin itchiness. It is used as fertilizer because it adds a wide range of minerals to the soil.

References

Ulvaceae
Plants described in 1753
Taxa named by Carl Linnaeus
Flora of Africa
Flora of Asia
Flora of Europe
Flora of North America
Flora of New Zealand